The City Point Community Church (also known as the Brevard County Environmental Field Station) is a historic church in Cocoa, Florida, United States. It is located at 3783 North Indian River Drive.

It was originally constructed as a public hall, school, and non-denominational church for both black and white residents. A five-person board of trustees was formed to act on this effort. The land was donated by J.C. Norwood. It was designed by board member A.L. Hatch and built by board member John M. Sanders, who completed the work on November 1, 1885. Other board members were William H. Sharpe, George W. Holmes, and George H. Chester. The structure served as the beginning congregation for several churches, including the United Methodist Church of Cocoa, Church of Christ, Church of God, Primitive Baptist Church, Calvin Baptist Church, Indian River Baptist Church, Baptist Enterprise Church, and the First Apostolic Temple. The building was used as a school until 1924. Picnics, dances, political rallies, a precinct voting station and observation tower during World War II were some of the uses the community found for the building.

On June 20, 1995, it was added to the U.S. National Register of Historic Places.

References

External links
 Brevard County listings at National Register of Historic Places
 Florida's Office of Cultural and Historical Programs
 Brevard County markers
 

United Methodist churches in Florida
Baptist churches in Florida
Pentecostal churches in Florida
National Register of Historic Places in Brevard County, Florida
Carpenter Gothic church buildings in Florida
Churches in Brevard County, Florida
1885 establishments in Florida
Churches completed in 1885